Kembra is a South Pauwasi language spoken in Western New Guinea by some twenty persons in Kiambra village, Kaisenar District, Keerom Regency. It is used by between 20% and 60% of the ethnic population and is no longer passed down to children.

Classification
Initial documentation was carried out by Barnabas Konel and Roger Doriot. Kembra data remains unpublished in Konel's and Doriot's field notes.

Foley (2018) notes that Kembra has some lexical forms resembling Lepki, but not Murkim, hinting at lexical borrowing between Kembra and  Lepki, but not Murkim. He allows the possibility of Kembra being related to Lepki–Murkim, pending further evidence. With more data, Usher (2020) was able to verify the connection.

Phonology
Kembra is a tonal language, as shown by the following minimal pair.
yá ‘pig’
yà ‘fire, tree’

Basic vocabulary
Basic vocabulary of Kembra listed in Foley (2018):

{| 
|+ Kembra basic vocabulary
! gloss !! Kembra
|-
| ‘bird’ || tra
|-
| ‘blood’ || nili
|-
| ‘bone’ || ka
|-
| ‘eat’ || ɲəm
|-
| ‘egg’ || traləl
|-
| ‘eye’ || yi
|-
| ‘fire’ || ya
|-
| ‘give’ || lokwes
|-
| ‘ground’ || to
|-
| ‘hair’ || iyet
|-
| ‘I’ || mu
|-
| ‘leg’ || kla
|-
| ‘louse’ || nim
|-
| ‘man’ || ratera
|-
| ‘name’ || kia
|-
| ‘one’ || kutina
|-
| ‘see’ || iyam
|-
| ‘stone’ || isi
|-
| ‘sun’ || ota
|-
| ‘tooth’ || pa
|-
| ‘tree’ || ya
|-
| ‘two’ || kais
|-
| ‘water’ || er
|-
| ‘we’ || utuas
|-
| ‘you (sg)’ || amagrei
|-
| ‘you (pl)’ || robkei
|}

Sentences
Kembra has SOV word order, and also appears to have bipartite negation as in Abun and French. Only several sentences have been elicited by Konel (n.d.), which are quoted below from Foley (2018).

References

Critically endangered languages
Lepki–Murkim languages
Tonal languages